Universe is the fourth studio album by Swedish rock band Truckfighters, released on 21 February 2014 on Fuzzorama Records.

Track listing
All tracks written by Truckfighters.

Personnel

Truckfighters
 Ozo - bass, vocals
 Dango - guitars

Additional musicians
 Poncho - drums (tracks 1 and 7)
 Pezo - drums (tracks 2-6)
 Rebecca Nylander - backing vocals (track 3)

References

2014 albums
Truckfighters albums